Max Bruch's Violin Concerto No. 1 in G minor, Op. 26, is one of the most popular violin concertos in solo violin repertoire and, along with the Scottish Fantasy, the composer's most famous work. It has been recorded often.

History 
The concerto was first completed in 1866 and the first performance was given on 24 April 1866 by Otto von Königslow, with Bruch conducting. The concerto was then considerably revised with help from celebrated violinist Joseph Joachim and completed in its present form in 1867. The premiere of the revised concerto was given by Joachim in Bremen on 7 January 1868, with Karl Martin Rheinthaler conducting.

Fate of the score
Bruch sold the score to the publisher N. Simrock outright for a small lump sum — but he kept a copy of his own. At the end of World War I, he was destitute, having been unable to enforce the payment of royalties for his other works because of chaotic world-wide economic conditions.  He sent his autograph to the duo-pianists Rose and Ottilie Sutro (for whom he had written his Concerto in A-flat minor for Two Pianos and Orchestra, Op. 88a, in 1912), so that they could sell it in the United States and send him the money. Bruch died in October 1920, without ever receiving any money. The Sutro sisters decided to keep the score themselves, but they claimed to have sold it, and sent Bruch's family some worthless German paper money as the alleged proceeds of the alleged sale. They always refused to divulge any details of the supposed purchaser.  In 1949, they sold the autograph to Mary Flagler Cary, whose collection, including the Bruch concerto, now resides at the Pierpont Morgan Public Library in New York City.

Instrumentation
The work is scored for solo violin and a standard classical orchestra consisting of two flutes, two oboes, two clarinets, two bassoons, four horns, two trumpets, timpani, and strings.

Movements

The concerto is in three movements:

Lasting popularity
Bruch also composed two more violin concertos, but neither has gained as much fame as his first, which continues to be very popular in both repertoire and audience terms. This was a source of great frustration for Bruch, who wrote to Simrock: “Nothing compares to the laziness, stupidity and dullness of many German violinists. Every fortnight another one comes to me wanting to play the first concerto. I have now become rude; and have told them: ‘I cannot listen to this concerto any more – did I perhaps write just this one? Go away and once and for all play the other concertos, which are just as good, if not better.”

In 1903 Bruch visited Naples, and local violinists gathered near where he was staying to salute him. Bruch complained: “On the corner of the Via Toledo they stand there, ready to break out with my first violin concerto as soon as I allow myself to be seen. (They can all go to the devil! As if I had not written other equally good concertos!)”

In 1996, it was voted the number one work in the Classic FM (UK) Hall of Fame by the station's listeners. In its profile of Bruch, Classic FM described the violin concerto as "one of the best works of the Romantic period".

In October 2019, the concerto was the subject of BBC Radio 4's Tales from the Stave with Joshua Bell seeing the original manuscript for the first time.

References

External links
 

  Interesting program notes by Michael Steinberg about Joseph Joachim's evaluation of this and a few other violin concertos.
Bruch Violin Concerto No. 1 in G minor, Op. 26 played by Ida Haendel: Movement 1, Movement 2, Movement 3. 2005 recording with orchestra conducted by Igor Gruppman.

Concertos by Max Bruch
Bruch 01
1866 compositions
1867 compositions
Compositions in G minor